The 2018–19 Girabola was the 41st season of top-tier football in Angola. The season was held from 27 October 2018 to 19 May 2019.

The league was contested by 16 teams and the bottom three teams were relegated to the 2020 Provincial stages.

In the 13th round match between Saurimo FC and ASA, the home team goal-keeper Anselmo, felt confident enough to leave his goal unguarded and shoot a free kick that had been awarded for his team, 25 minutes into the game. His confidence paid off as he scored the only goal in the home team's 1-0 win, something unheard of in Angolan football.

Teams
A total of 16 teams contested the league, including 13 sides from the 2018 season and three promoted from the 2018 Segundona - ASA, Saurimo FC (ex-Bikuku FC) and Santa Rita de Cássia.

On the other hand, Domant FC, J.G.M. and Primeiro de Maio were the last three teams of the 2018 season and played in their respective provincial leagues seeking qualification for the 2019–20 2nd division qualifiers. Clube Desportivo Primeiro de Agosto were the defending champions from the 2018 season.

Changes from 2018 season
Relegated: Domant FC, J.G.M., Primeiro de Maio 
Promoted: ASA, Saurimo FC (ex-Bikuku FC), Santa Rita de Cássia

FAF penalties
 As a result of a match-fixing investigation launched by the Angolan Football Federation (FAF) on the 17th round match between Desportivo da Huila and 1º de Agosto, each team forfeited 3 points and a $5,000 fine.
 Kabuscorp do Palanca forfeited 9 points, for failing to address payment claims by a total 6 former employees (including players, technical and medical staff), following a 15-day deadline stipulated by FAF.
 Bravos do Maquis forfeited 3 points, for failing to address payment claims by former player Silvino Assete, following a 15-day deadline stipulated by FAF.

FIFA penalty
The Angolan Football Federation was instructed by FIFA to relegate Kabuscorp for failing to meet payment claims by former player Rivaldo. Even though the debt has reportedly been paid in full, Kabuscorp failed to pay within the established deadline. The club faced a second relegation penalty regarding their dispute with TP Mazembe

Stadiums and locations

League table

Results

Positions by round

Clubs season progress

Statistics

Top scorers

Hat-tricks

References

External links
 Match schedule

Girabola seasons
Girabola
Angola